Beşkaya can refer to:

 Beşkaya, Olur
 Beşkaya, Tercan